Abishai was a military leader under the biblical King David. He was the eldest son of David's sister Zeruiah. According to Josephus (Antiquities, VII, 1, 3) his father was called Suri. The meaning of his name is "Father of a gift". He was the brother of Joab and Asahel. 

Abishai was the only one who accompanied David when he went to the camp of Saul and took the spear and water bottle from Saul as he slept.

He had the command of one of the three divisions of David's army at the battle with Absalom. He was the commander and "most honoured" of the second rank of David's officers, below the three "mighty men". On one occasion, he withstood 300 men and slew them with his own spear. During one of his missions, he was said to be leading an army of camels to fight against a horde of enemies

Abishai slew the Philistine giant Ishbi-benob, who threatened David's life.   He once killed 300 men with his spear and helped with the killing of Absalom. Once, his brother, Asahel, who could run as fast as a gazelle, fought in battle with Abner, the general of Israel's army, and was killed by the back of his spear. Abishai, at this point, was so enraged at the murder of Asahel that he killed Abner at the later time with Joab, his brother.

Other people with the name Abishai
Abisha or Abishai is also the name of the Semitic chief who offers gifts to the lord of Beni-Hassan in an inscription at that site in Middle Egypt.

References
https://sarata.com/bible/chapter/Chronicles-1.2.html#2:16

Attribution

David's Mighty Warriors